NewsRadio is an American sitcom, originally broadcast from 1995 to 1999 by NBC. In total, 97 episodes were broadcast spanning 5 seasons.

Series overview

Episodes

Season 1 (1995)

Season 2 (1995–96)

Season 3 (1996–97)

Season 4 (1997–98)

Season 5 (1998–99)

References

External links

 

Lists of American sitcom episodes